Francis Goldsmith (by 1518 – 26 March 1586) of London and Crayford, Kent, was an English politician.

He was a servant of Henry VIII's sixth wife, Catherine Parr. He was a Member (MP) of the Parliament of England for Chippenham in 1547, for Mitchell in October 1553 and Helston in 1559. His daughter Anne married William Lewin.

Notes

References

External links
Will of Francis Goldsmith, gentleman, of Crayford, Kent, proved 13 May 1586, PROB 11/69/267, National Archives Retrieved 1 September 2013

1586 deaths
Members of the pre-1707 English Parliament for constituencies in Cornwall
English MPs 1547–1552
English MPs 1553 (Mary I)
English MPs 1559
Year of birth uncertain